Fredrik Magnus Cronberg (1668 in Stockholm - April 23, 1740), was a former governor of Västerbotten, Sweden.

Biography 
from 1688 to 1690, he served in the Nyland and Tavastehus County Cavalry Regiment. From 1690 to 1693, he served in the Dutch War Service. He fought in multiple wars, including the Great Nordic War, the Battle of Narva (where he was severely wounded).

In 1717, he became governor of Västerbotten.

See also
List of Uppsala Governors
List of Västerbotten Governors

References 

Swedish nobility
18th-century Swedish politicians
Age of Liberty people
Governors of Västerbotten County
Governors of Uppsala County
1668 births
1740 deaths